Nelius Theron (born 29 January 1997) is a Namibian rugby union player for the n national team and for the  in the Currie Cup and the Rugby Challenge. His regular position is prop.

Rugby career

Theron was born in Windhoek.

References

External links
 

1997 births
Living people
Leopards (rugby union) players
Namibia international rugby union players
Namibian rugby union players
Rugby union players from Windhoek
Rugby union props
Welwitschias players